Fritz Warncke (born 29 December 1955) is a Norwegian freestyle swimmer. He was born in Bergen. He competed at the 1972 Summer Olympics in Munich and at the 1976 Summer Olympics in Montreal.

References

External links

1955 births
Living people
Sportspeople from Bergen
Norwegian male freestyle swimmers
Olympic swimmers of Norway
Swimmers at the 1976 Summer Olympics
Swimmers at the 1972 Summer Olympics
20th-century Norwegian people